The Marcel Bangladesh Championship League 2017 was 6th season of the Bangladesh Championship League since its establishment. A total of 10 teams are competing in the league. The league has kicked off August 4, 2017 and come to end on November 4, 2017. Bashundhara Kings is the winner of this season.

League standing

Venue
Other than Feni Soccer Club (having their own venue) and NoFeL Sporting Club, rest of the participating clubs is based in Dhaka. Therefore, BFF has decided to conduct all matches of the at Bir Sherestha Shaheed Shipahi Mostafa Kamal Stadium, Kamlapur, Dhaka.

References 

Bangladesh Championship League seasons
2017 in Asian association football leagues
2017 in Bangladeshi football